Lisianski  (Lisiansky, Lisyansky) may refer to one of the following.

Yuri Feodorovich Lisyansky, an officer in the Imperial Russian Navy and explorer
Things named after Lisyansky:
Lisianski Island, Hawaii
Lisianski Peninsula, located on the west coast of Baranof Island in the Alaska Panhandle.
Lisianski Mountain, Sakhalin
Lisianski Strait, at the northern end of Chichagof Island, Alaska
Lisianski Bay
Cape Lisianski